The New Zealand St. Leger is a major thoroughbred horse race run at Trentham Racecourse in New Zealand on New Zealand Oaks day in March each year.

Race conditions and scheduling

It was run over 2500m up until 2018 and 2600m from 2019 onward, it is a test of a horse's staying ability.

Originally a race for three-year-old horses, it was later opened up to both three- and four-year olds and then from 2019 the race became an Open race with set weights and penalties.

Other notable races on New Zealand Oaks day are the:

 Levin Classic (1600m for 3 year olds).
 Cuddle Stakes (1600m for fillies and mares).
 Lightning Handicap (1200m).

Notable winners

Among the past winners are some of the great New Zealand racehorses:

 Beau Vite (the winner in 1940) who won 31 races in New Zealand and Australia including both the 1940 and 1941 editions of the Cox Plate and Mackinnon Stakes and the 1940 Auckland Cup. 
 Dalray (1952) who, in a career cut short by injury, won the 1951 New Zealand Derby and in 1952 the Great Northern Derby,  Metropolitan Handicap, Mackinnon Stakes and Melbourne Cup.
 Kindergarten (1941) who won 25 of his 35 starts and was one of five inaugural inductees to the New Zealand Racing Hall of Fame.
 Mainbrace (1951) who won 23 of his 25 starts and was inducted into the New Zealand Racing Hall of Fame.
 Silver Knight (1971) who went on to win the Melbourne Cup in the same year.

Although in recent years the New Zealand St. Leger has diminished in stature it has continued to attract high class stayers, such as:

 Hail (2002): winner of the 2000 New Zealand Derby, 2002 Sandown Classic and 2003 Zabeel Classic.
 Jacksstar (2016): winner of the 2019 Awapuni Gold Cup and 2016 Manawatu Cup.
 Rock On (2017): winner of the 2018 Manawatu Cup.
 Sampson (2019): winner of the 2017 Awapuni Gold Cup.
 Waisake (2021): winner of the 2021 Wellington Cup
 Leaderboard (2022): winner of the 2023 Wellington Cup

Race results

See also

 Thoroughbred racing in New Zealand

References

 PedigreeQuery.com

External links
 New Zealand St. Leger winners

Horse races in New Zealand
Open middle distance horse races